Jijk (also Romanized as Jījk; also known as Jījag, Jajk, Jejg, and Jījong) is a village in Kahshang Rural District, in the Central District of Birjand County, South Khorasan Province, Iran. At the 2016 census, its population was 36, in 17 families.

References 

Populated places in Birjand County